Bruce Weber may refer to:

Bruce Weber (administrator) (1951–2006), Australian sports administrator
Bruce Weber (basketball) (born 1956), American basketball coach
Bruce Weber (photographer) (born 1946), American photographer and film director
Bruce Weber (reporter) (born 1953), American reporter for The New York Times